Eddie Steeples (born November 25, 1973) is an American actor known for his roles as the "Rubberband Man" in an advertising campaign for OfficeMax, Cal in Would You Rather, and as Darnell Turner on the NBC sitcom My Name Is Earl.

Life and career
Steeples was born and raised in Spring, Texas, the oldest of eight children. He was dubbed the "Distinguished Dog" in grade school by his friends and family due his dignified and doglike appearance. After graduating from Klein Oak High School in 1992, he moved to Santa Cruz, California, where he took acting classes at Cabrillo College. He later studied with the St. Louis Black Repertory Theatre and briefly at Howard University, eventually settling in New York City. There Steeples joined the experimental film group Mo-Freek, and a hip hop group, No Surrender. Among the Mo-Freek productions he has starred in are Lost in the Bush, Caravan Summer, and People Are Dead. He also starred in the short film Whoa and appeared as a guest on The Chris Rock Show.

Steeples became nationally known when he was cast as the "Rubberband Man" in a series of commercials for OfficeMax. He has also appeared in feature films.

Steeples played the role of Darnell Turner on the NBC comedy series My Name Is Earl, which premiered on September 20, 2005 and ran for four seasons. Steeples on the show was known as Darnell Turner (witness protection name) aka Harry Monroe (real name) a.k.a. "Crab Man".

Filmography

Television

References

External links

Eddie Steeples' talks about his tattoos at Inked Magazine

1973 births
Male actors from Houston
African-American male actors
American male film actors
American male television actors
Living people
Male actors from St. Louis
People from Spring, Texas
21st-century African-American people
20th-century African-American people